This a list of vocational colleges in Uganda. This list is not exhaustive.
Redan Business and Vocational Institute, Makerere Kampala
Ntinda Vocational Training Institute
 Uganda Petroleum Institute Kigumba
 Uganda Technical College, Kichwamba
 Bukalasa Agricultural Training Institute
 Uganda Technical College Elgon
 Uganda Technical College Bushenyi 
 Uganda Technical College Lira
 Nakawa Vocational Training Institute
 Uganda Hotel and Tourism Training Institute
 Buganda Royal Institute of Business and Technical Education, Mengo
 Karera Technical Institute in Bushenyi District
 Nyamitanga Technical Institute in Mbarara District
 Rwentanga Farm Institute in Mbarara District
 Kitgum Technical Institute in Kitgum District
 Kalongo Technical Institute in Agago District
 Ora Technical Institute in Zombo District
 Butaleja Technical Institute in Butaleja District
 Kasodo Tehanical Institute in Pallisa District
 Kaliro Technical Institute in Kaliro District
 Ssese Farm Institute in Kalangala District
 Lake Katwe Training Institute in Kasese District
 Kaberamaido Technical Institute in Kaberamaido District
 Ogolai Technical Institute in Amuria
 Buhimba Technical Institute in Hoima
 Lwengo Technical Institute in Lwengo
 Namataba Technical Institute in Namataba
 Sasiira Technical Institute in Nakasongola
 Kilak Corner Technical Institute in Pader
 Arua Technical Institute Ragem in Arua City
 Lokopio Technical Institute in Yumbe.
 National Teachers College, Unyama in Gulu District
 National Teachers College, Muni in Arua
 National Teachers College, Mubende in Mubende
 National Teachers College, Kabale in Kabale
 National Teachers College, Kaliro in Kaliro
 St. Simon Vocational Institute Hoima, in Hoima

See also
List of universities in Uganda

References

External links
 List of Technical Schools in Uganda

 
Uganda
Education in Uganda
Universities and colleges in Uganda
Vocational education in Uganda
Vocational universities and colleges
Uganda
Universities and colleges in Africa
Vocational colleges